Măgirești is a commune in Bacău County, Western Moldavia, Romania. It is composed of five villages: Măgirești, Prăjești, Stănești, Șesuri and Valea Arinilor.

References

Communes in Bacău County
Localities in Western Moldavia